The Battle of Krücken was a medieval battle fought in 1249 during the Prussian Crusades between the Teutonic Order and Prussians, one of the Baltic tribes. In terms of knights killed, it was the fourth largest defeat of the Teutonic Knights in the 13th century.

Marshal Heinrich Botel gathered men from Kulm, Elbing, and Balga for an expeditionary attack deeper into Prussia. They traveled into the lands of the Natangians and pillaged the region. On their way back, they were in turn attacked by an army of Natangians. The Prussian army was growing as fresh troops arrived from more distant territories, and the Order did not have enough supplies to withstand a siege. Therefore, the Teutonic Order bargained for surrender: the marshal and three other knights were to remain as hostages while the others were to lay down their weapons.

The Natangians broke the agreement and massacred 54 knights and a number of their followers. Some knights were executed in religious ceremonies or tortured to death. The severed head of Johann, vice-komtur of Balga, was mockingly displayed on a spear. Others were ransomed or exchanged, including Marshal Botel. Such barbarity gave the Teutonic Order an excuse not to treat the Prussians as civilized and honorable people. Never again did the knights surrender to pagans. The Natangians did not exploit their victory and did not make offensive moves into the lands of the Teutonic Order. It took two years for the crusading military order to recover and avenge the massacre.

References

1249 in Europe
Krucken
Conflicts in 1249
Prussian Crusade